The Ibans or Sea Dayaks are a branch of the Dayak peoples on the island of Borneo in South East Asia. Dayak is a title given by the westerners to the local people of Borneo island. It is believed that the term "Iban" was originally an exonym used by the Kayans, who – when they initially came into contact with them – referred to the Sea Dayaks in the upper Rajang river region as the "Hivan".

Ibans were renowned for practicing headhunting and territorial migration, and had a fearsome reputation as a strong and successfully warring tribe. Since the arrival for
Europeans and the subsequent colonisation of the area, headhunting gradually faded out of practice, although many other tribal customs and practices as well as the Iban language continue to thrive. The Iban population is concentrated in the state of Sarawak in Malaysia, Brunei, and the Indonesian province of West Kalimantan. They traditionally live in longhouses called rumah panjai or betang (trunk) in West Kalimantan.

History

Early origins
The Iban people of Borneo possess an indigenous account of their history, mostly in oral literature, partly in writing in papan turai (wooden records), and partly in common cultural customary practices.

According to myths and legend, they historically came from Kapuas river in Borneo but in Indonesia. They slowly moved to Sarawak due to tribal indifference. Some of these tribes manage to settle in Sri Aman river basin. During the period of personal rule by James Brooke, these tribes move further inland into Sarawak and came into conflict with many local tribes there.

18th–19th century
The colonial accounts and reports of Dayak activity in Borneo detail carefully cultivated economic and political relationships with other communities as well as an ample body of research and study concerning the history of Dayak migrations. In particular, the Iban or the Sea Dayak exploits in the South China Seas are documented, owing to their ferocity and aggressive culture of war against sea-dwelling groups and emerging Western trade interests in the 18th and 19th centuries.

In 1838, adventurer James Brooke arrived in the region to find the Sultan of Brunei in a desperate attempt to suppress a rebellion against his rule. Brooke aided the Sultan in putting down the rebellion, for which he was made Governor of Sarawak in 1841, being granted the title of Rajah. Brooke undertook operations to suppress Dayak piracy, establishing a secondary objective to put an end to their custom of headhunting as well. During his tenure as Governor, Brooke's most well-known Dayak opponent was the military commander Rentap; Brooke led three expeditions against him and finally defeated him at the Battle of Sadok Hill. During the expeditions, Brooke employed numerous Dayak troops, quipping that "only Dayaks can kill Dayaks". Brooke became embroiled in controversy in 1851 when accusations against him of excessive usage of force against the Dayaks, under the guise of anti-piracy operations, ultimately led to the appointment of a Commission of Inquiry in Singapore in 1854. After an investigation, the Commission dismissed the charges. Brooke employed his Dayak troops during other military expeditions, such as those against the Chinese-Malaysian insurgent Liu Shan Bang and Sarawak warrior Sharif Masahor.

After mass conversions to Christianity and anti-headhunting legislation by the European administrations was passed, the practice was banned and appeared to have disappeared. However, the Brooke-led Sarawak government, although banning unauthorized headhunting, allowed "ngayau" headhunting practices by the Brooke-supporting natives during military expeditions against rebellions throughout the state, thereby never really extinguishing the spirit of headhunting especially among the Iban natives. The state-sanctioned troops were allowed to take heads, properties like jars and brassware, burn houses and farms, exempted from paying door taxes, and in some cases, granted new territories to migrate into. This Brooke's practice was in remarkable contrast to the practice by the Dutch in the neighbouring West Kalimantan who prohibited any native participation in its punitive expeditions. Initially, James Brooke (the first Rajah of Sarawak) did engage his small navy in the Battle of  against the Iban and Malay of the Saribas region and the Iban of Skrang under Rentap's charge but this resulted in the Public Inquiry by the colonial government in Singapore. Thereafter, the Brooke government gathered a local troop who were its allies.

20th century
During the Second World War, Japanese forces occupied Borneo and treated all of the indigenous peoples poorly – massacres of the Malay and Dayak peoples were common, especially among the Dayaks of the Kapit Division. In response, the Dayaks formed a special force to assist the Allied forces. Eleven US airmen and a few dozen Australian special operatives trained a thousand Dayaks from the Kapit Division in guerrilla warfare. This army of tribesmen killed or captured some 1,500 Japanese soldiers and provided the Allies with vital intelligence about Japanese-held oil fields.

During the Malayan Emergency, the British Army employed Iban headhunters against the Malayan National Liberation Army (MNLA). Typically two would be attached to each infantry patrol as trackers and general assistants, acting as the platoon commander's eyes and ears in this deeply alien environment. News of this was exposed to the public 1952 when the British communist newspaper called The Daily Worker published multiple photographs of Ibans and British soldiers posing with the severed heads of suspected MNLA members. Initially, the British government denied allowing Iban troops to practise headhunting against the MNLA, until Colonial Secretary Oliver Lyttleton confirmed to Parliament that the Ibans were indeed granted such a right to do so. All Dayak troops were disbanded upon the end of the conflict.

Ibanic Dayak regional groups

Although Ibans generally speak various dialects which are mutually intelligible, they can be divided into different branches which are named after the geographical areas where they reside.

 The majority of Ibans who live around the Lundu and Samarahan region are called Sebuyaus.
 Ibans who settled in the Serian district (places like Kampung Lebor, Kampung Tanah Mawang and others) are called Remuns. They may be the earliest Iban group to migrate to Sarawak.
 Ibans who originated from Sri Aman area are called Balaus.
 Ibans who come from Betong, Saratok and parts of Sarikei are called Saribas'.
 The original Iban, Lubok Antu Ibans, are classed by anthropologists as Ulu Ai/batang ai Ibans.
 Ibans from Undup are called Undup Ibans. Their dialect is a cross between the Ulu Ai and the Balau dialects.
 Ibans living in areas from Sarikei to Miri are called Rajang Ibans. This group is also known as Bilak Sedik Iban. They are the majority group of the Iban people. They can be found along: the Rajang River, Sibu, Kapit, Belaga, Kanowit, Song, Sarikei, Bintangor, Bintulu and Miri. Their dialect is somewhat similar to the Ulu Ai or Lubok Antu dialect.

In West Kalimantan (Indonesia), Iban people are even more diverse. The Kantu, Air Tabun, Seberuang, Sebaru, Bugau, Mualang, and many other groups are classed as Ibanic people by anthropologists. They can be related to the Iban either by dialect cultural customs or rituals.

Language and oral literature

The Iban language (jaku Iban) is spoken by the Iban, a branch of the Dayak ethnic group formerly known as "Sea Dayak". The language belongs to Malayic languages, which is a Malayo-Polynesian branch of the Austronesian language family. It is thought that the homeland of the Malayic languages is in western Borneo, where the Ibanic languages remain. The Malayic branch represents a secondary dispersal, probably from central Sumatra but possibly also from Borneo.

The Iban people speak basically one language with regional dialects that vary in intonation. They have a rich oral literature, as noted by Vincent Sutlive when meeting Derek Freeman, a professor of anthropology at the Australian National University who stated: Derek Freeman told me that Iban folklore "probably exceeds in sheer volume the literature of the Greeks. At that time, I thought Freeman excessive. Today, I suspect he may have been conservative in his estimate (Sutlive 1988: 73)." There is a body of oral poetry which is recited by the Iban depending on the occasion.

Nowadays, the Iban language is mostly taught at schools with Iban students in town and rural areas in Indonesia and Malaysia. The Iban language is included in Malaysian public school examinations for Form 3 and Form 5 students. Students comment that questions from these exams can be daunting, since they mostly cover the classic Iban language, while students are more fluent in the contemporary tongue.

Iban ritual festivals and rites

 Farming-related festivals for the deity of agriculture, Sempulang Gana
 War-related festivals to honour the deity of war, Sengalang Burong
 Fortune-related festivals dedicated to the deity of fortune, Anda Mara
 Procreation-related festival (Gawai Melah Pinang) for the deity of creation, Selampandai
 Health-related festivals for the gods of Shamanism, Menjaya and Ini Andan
 Death-related festival (Gawai Antu or Ngelumbong), including rituals to invite dead souls to their final separation from the living
 Weaving-related festival (Gawai Ngar) for patrons of weaving

For simplicity and cost savings, some of the  have been relegated into the medium category of propitiation called . These include Gawai Tuah into Nimang Tuah, Gawai Benih into Nimang Benih and Gawa Beintu-intu into their respective nimang category, wherein the key activity is the timang incantation by the bards. Gawai Matah can be relegated into a minor rite simply called matah. The paddy's net is erected by splitting a bamboo trunk lengthwise into four pieces with the tips inserted into the ground. Underneath the paddy's net, baskets or gunny sacks hold all the paddy seeds. Then men distribute the seeds to a line of ladies who place them into dibbled holes.

Often festivals are celebrated by the Iban today based on needs and economy.

Commonly, all those festivals are celebrated after rice harvesting near the end of May. At harvest time, there is plenty of food for feasting. Not only is rice plentiful, but also poultry, pigs, chickens, fish, and jungle meats around this time. Therefore, it is fitting to collectively call this festive season among Dayak as the Gawai Dayak festival. It is celebrated every year on 1 and 2 June, at the end of the harvest season, to worship the Lord Sempulang Gana and other gods. On this day, the Iban visit family and friends and gather to celebrate. It is the right timing for a new year resolution, turn around, adventures, projects or sojourns. These new endeavours and undertakings are initiatives or activities under a popular practice known as 'bejalai', 'belelang' or 'pegi'.

Iban Religion

Iban or Sea Dayaks have its own traditional religious system called "pengarap Iban". The Encyclopedia of Iban Studies (2001) states that:

“The Iban lexeme petara or betara is a loan from Sanskrit, ‘pitr, ‘ancestors” (Richards 1981:281) [q.q]) or pitarah, the name of a Hindu deity. There are at least two, possibly three, categories of gods under the pantheon of the Iban religion. First, there are creator gods, beings who in the beginning brought into being land, sky, water, and human beings. Second, there are principal gods whose functions are crucially important to human activities and survival. Finally, there are the mythic culture heroes or spirit heroes, whose adventures involve and influence the affairs of Iban men and women. These categories of deities illustrate difficulties in achieving consensus regarding projected beings. 

The unified pantheon of the Iban religion is headed by Petara who is the supreme deity or principal God, Raja petara, also known as Entala or Keri Raja petara. This supreme God heads the creator gods who are Seragindah who creates land, Seragindi who creates water and Seragindit who creates the sky.

According to Benedict Sandin his book of Iban Adat and Augury, under the same supreme God, there are then seven gods of specific purpose including two sisters who are Pantan Ini’ Andan (of the sky as the god of justice) and Biku Indu’ Antu (of the earth as the god of worshipping)” (p.1458) and five brothers namely Sengalang Burong (god of war), Sempulang Gana (god of agriculture), Selampandai Selampeta Selampetoh (god of smithing), Menjaya (god of shamanism) and Anda Mara (god of fortune). These seven gods are known as the Orang Raja Durong who descended from Raja Chananum Raja Chanuda. Among others, the famous cultural heroes and heroines of the Orang Panggau and Gelong who descended from Tambai Chiri are Keling, Laja and Sempurai and Kumang, Lulong and Indai Abang. These gods and heroes appear to human beings in dreams and in augury bird, animal and snake forms in this world. 

James Jemut Masing in his PhD thesis of The Coming Of Gods states that to worship this pantheon, there are three categories of propitiatory ceremonies under the Iban religion i.e. bedara (offerings of ascending order), gawa (chanting of various kinds) and gawai (elaborate ritual festival of ascending degrees). Derek Freeman in his paper of Iban Augury states that divination among Iban can be achieved via five methods: dream, pig liver commentary, deliberate augury seeking, chance augury  encounter and solitude. Clifford Sather in his article of Iban Longhouse: Posts and Hearths states that the longhouse acts as both accommodation and ritual space.

Culture and customs

Kinship in Dayak society is traced in both lines of genealogy. Although in Dayak Iban society, men and women possess equal rights in status and property ownership, the political office has strictly been the occupation of the traditional Iban patriarch. There is a council of elders in each longhouse.

Overall, Dayak leadership in any given region is marked by titles, a Penghulu for instance would have invested authority on behalf of a network of Tuai Rumah's and so on to a Pemancha, Pengarah to Temenggung in the ascending order while Panglima or Orang Kaya (Rekaya) are titles given by Malays to some Dayaks.

Individual Dayak groups have their social and hierarchy systems defined internally, and these differ widely from Ibans to Ngajus and Benuaqs to Kayans.

In Sarawak, Temenggong Koh Anak Jubang was the first paramount chief of Dayaks in Sarawak and was followed by Tun Temenggong Jugah Anak Barieng who was one of the main signatories for the formation of the Federation of Malaysia between Malaya, Singapore, Sabah and Sarawak with Singapore expelled later on. He was said to be the "bridge between Malaya and East Malaysia". The latter was fondly called "Apai" by others, which means father. He received no western or formal education.

The most salient feature of Dayak social organisation is the practice of Longhouse domicile. This is a structure supported by hardwood posts that can be hundreds of metres long, usually located along a terraced river bank. At one side is a long communal platform, from which the individual households can be reached.

The Iban of the Kapuas and Sarawak have organised their Longhouse settlements in response to their migratory patterns. Iban longhouses vary in size, from those slightly over 100 metres in length to large settlements over 500 metres in length. Longhouses have a door and apartment for every family living in the longhouse. For example, a longhouse of 200 doors is equivalent to a settlement of 200 families.

The tuai rumah (longhouse chief) can be aided by a tuai burong (bird leader), tuai umai (farming leader), and a manang (shaman). Nowadays, each longhouse will have a Security and Development Committee and ad hoc committee will be formed as and when necessary for example during festivals such as Gawai Dayak.

The Dayaks are peace-loving people who live based on customary rules or adat asal which govern each of their main activities. The adat is administered by the tuai rumah aided by the Council of Elders in the longhouse so that any dispute can be settled amicably among the dwellers themselves via berandau (discussion). If no settlement can be reached at the longhouse chief level, then the dispute will escalate to a more senior leader in the region or pengulu (district chief) level in modern times and so on.

Among the main sections of customary adat of the Iban Dayaks are as follows:
  (House building rule)
  (Marriage, adultery, and divorce rule)
  (Childbearing and raising rule)
  (Agricultural and land use rule)
  (Headhunting rule) and adapt ngintu anti Pala (head skull keeping)
  (Hunting, fishing, fruit and honey collection rule)
  (Widow/widower, mourning and soul separation rule)
  (festival rule)
  (Order of life in the longhouse rule)
  (Weaving, past times, dance and music rule)
  (Bird and animal omen, dream and pig liver rule)
  (Journey rule)

The Dayak life centres on the paddy planting activity every year. The Iban Dayak has their own year-long calendar with 12 consecutive months which are one month later than the Roman calendar. The months are named in accordance with the paddy farming activities and the activities in between. Other than paddy, also planted in the farm are vegetables like , pumpkin, round brinjal, cucumber, corn,  and other food sources like tapioca, sugarcane, sweet potatoes and finally after the paddy has been harvested, cotton is planted which takes about two months to complete its cycle. The cotton is used for weaving before commercial cotton is traded.

Fresh lands cleared by each Dayak family will belong to that family and the longhouse community can also use the land with permission from the owning family. Usually, in one riverine system, a special tract of land is reserved for the use by the community itself to get natural supplies of wood, rattan, and other wild plants which are necessary for building houses, boats, coffins, and other living purposes, and also to leave living space for wild animals which is a source of meat.

Besides farming, Dayaks plant fruit trees like kepayang, dabai, rambutan, langsat, durian, isu, nyekak, and mangosteen near their longhouses or on their land plots to mark their ownership of the land. They also grow plants that produce dyes for colouring their cotton treads if not taken from the wild forest. Major fishing using the tuba root is normally done by the whole longhouse as the river may take some time to recover. Any wild meat obtained will be distributed according to a certain customary law which specifies the game catcher will the head or horn and several portions of the game while others would get an equally divided portion each. This rule allows every family a chance to supply meat which is the main source of protein.

Headhunting was an important part of the Dayak culture, in particular to the Iban and Kenyah. The origin of headhunting in Iban Dayaks can be traced to the story of a chief name Serapoh who was asked by a spirit to obtain a fresh head to open a mourning jar but unfortunately killed a Kantu boy which he got by exchanging with a jar for this purpose for which the Kantu retaliated and thus starting the headhunting practice. There used to be a tradition of retaliation for old headhunts, which kept the practice alive. External interference by the reign of the Brooke Rajahs in Sarawak via "bebanchak babi" (peacemaking) in Kapit and the Dutch in Kalimantan Borneo via peacemaking at Tumbang Anoi curtailed and limited this tradition.

Apart from mass raids, the practice of headhunting was then limited to individual retaliation attacks or the result of chance encounters. Early Brooke Government reports describing Dayak Iban and Kenyah War parties with captured enemy heads. At various times, there have been massive coordinated raids in the interior and throughout coastal Borneo before and after the arrival of the Raj during Brooke's reign in Sarawak.

The Ibans' journey along the coastal regions using a large boat called "bandong" with sails made of leaves or cloths may have given rise to the term, Sea Dayak, although, throughout the 19th Century, Sarawak Government raids and independent expeditions appeared to have been carried out as far as Brunei, Mindanao, East coast Malaya, Jawa and Celebes.

Tandem diplomatic relations between the Sarawak Government (Brooke Rajah) and Britain (East India Company and the Royal Navy) acted as a pivot and a deterrence to the former's territorial ambitions, against the Dutch administration in the Kalimantan regions and client sultanates.

Religion and belief

For hundreds of years, the Iban's ancestors practiced their own traditional custom and pagan religious system.  European Christian colonial invaders, after the arrival of James Brooke, led to the  influence of European missionaries and conversions to Christianity. Although the majority are now Christian; many continue to observe both Christian and traditional pagan ceremonies, particularly during marriages or festivals, although some ancestral practices such as 'Miring' are still prohibited by certain churches. After being Christianized, the majority of Iban people have changed their traditional name to a Hebrew-based "Christian name" followed by the Ibanese name such as David Dunggau, Joseph Jelenggai, Mary Mayang, etc.

For the majority of Ibans who are Christians, some Christian festivals such as Christmas, Good Friday, Easter are also celebrated. Some Ibans are devout Christians and follow the Christian faith strictly. Since conversion to Christianity, some Iban people celebrate their ancestors' pagan festivals using Christian ways and the majority still observe Gawai Dayak (the Dayak Festival), which is a generic celebration in nature unless a  proper is held and thereby preserves their ancestors' culture and tradition.

In Brunei, 1,503 Ibans have converted to Islam from 2009–2019 according to official statistics. Many Bruneian Ibans intermarry with Malays and convert to Islam as a result. Nevertheless, most Iban in Brunei are devout Christians similar to the Iban in Malaysia. Bruneian Ibans also often intermarry with the Murut or Christian Chinese due to their shared faith.

Despite the difference in faiths, Ibans of different faiths do live and help each other regardless of faith but some do split their longhouses due to different faiths or even political affiliations. The Ibans believe in helping and having fun together. Some elder Ibans are worried that among most of the younger Iban generation, their culture has faded since the conversion to Christianity and the adoption of a more modern life style. Nevertheless, most Iban embrace modern progress and development.

Many Christian Dayaks have adopted European names, but some continue to maintain their ancestors' traditional names. Since the conversion of most Iban people to Christianity, some have generally abandoned their ancestors' beliefs such as 'Miring' or the celebration of 'Gawai Antu', and many celebrate only Christianized traditional festivals.

Numerous local people and certain missionaries have sought to document and preserve traditional Dayak religious practices. For example, Reverend William Howell contributed numerous articles on the Iban language, lore, and culture between 1909 and 1910 to the Sarawak Gazette. The articles were later compiled in a book in 1963 entitled, The Sea Dayaks and Other Races of Sarawak.

Cuisine
A middle-aged bamboo tree is normally chosen to make containers because its wall still contains water; old, mature bamboo trees are dryer and are burned by fire more readily. The bamboo also imparts the famous and addictive, special bamboo taste or flavour to the cooked food or rice. Glutinous rice is often cooked in bamboo for the routine diet or during celebrations. It is believed in the old days, bamboo cylinders were used to cook food in the absence of metal pots.

 is preserved meat, fish or vegetable. In the absence of refrigerators, jungle meat from wild game, river fish or vegetable are preserved by cutting them into small pieces and mixing them with salt before placing them in a ceramic jar or today, glass jars. Ceramic jars were precious in the old days as food, tuak or general containers. Meat preserved in this manner can last for at least several months. Preserved meats are mixed with 'daun and buah kepayang' (local leaf and nut).

Tuak is an Iban wine traditionally made from cooked glutinous rice mixed with home-made yeast (ciping) containing herbs for fermentation. It is used to serve guests, especially as a welcoming drink when entering a longhouse. However, these raw materials are rarely used unless available in large quantities.
 
Another type of stronger alcoholic drink is called  (hut) or arak pandok (cooked spirit). It contains a higher alcohol content because it is actually made of tuak which has been distilled over fire to boil off the alcohol, cooled and collected into containers.
 
Besides, the Iban like to preserve foods by smoking them over the hearth. Smoked foods are called 'salai'. These can be eaten directly or cooked, perhaps with vegetables.

The Iban traditional cakes are called 'penganan', and 'tumpi' (deep fried but not hardened) and chuwan' and 'sarang semut' (deep fried to harden and to last long).

The Iban will cook glutinous rice in bamboo containers or wrapped in leaves called 'daun long'.

During the early rice harvesting, the Iban like to make 'kemping padi' (something like oat).

Music

Iban music is percussion-oriented. The Iban have a musical heritage consisting of various types of agung ensembles – percussion ensembles composed of large hanging, suspended or held, bossed/knobbed gongs which act as drums without any accompanying melodic instrument.

One example of Iban traditional music is the taboh.
The  can be played in some distinctive types corresponding to the purpose and type of each ceremony.

Sape is originally a traditional music by Orang Ulu (Kayan, Kenyah and Kelabit). Nowadays, both the Iban as well as the Orang Ulu Kayan, Kenyah and Kelabit play an instrument resembling the guitar called the sape. The sape is the official musical instrument of the Malaysian state of Sarawak. It is played similarly to the way rock guitarists play guitar solos, albeit a little slower, but not as slow as the blues.

Handicrafts

, bamboo stoves, bamboo containers and frightening masks. Another related category is designing motives either by engraving or drawing with paints on wooden planks, walls or house posts. Even traditional coffins may be beautifully decorated using both carving and ukir-painting. The Iban plaits good armlets or calvelets called 'simpai'.

The Ibans like to tattoo themselves all over their bodies. There are motifs for each part of the body. The purpose of the tattoos is to protect the tattoo bearer or to signify certain events in their life. Some motifs are based on marine lives such as the crayfish, prawn and crab, while other motifs are based on dangerous creatures like the cobra, scorpion, ghost dog and dragon.

Other important motifs of body tattoo include items or events which are worth commemorating and experienced or encountered by Iban during a sojourn or adventure such as an aeroplane which may be tattooed on the chest. To signify that an individual has killed an enemy, he is entitled to tattoo his throat or his upper-side fingers. Some traditional Iban do have piercings of the penis (called ) or the ear lobes. The Iban will tattoo their body as a whole in a holistic design, not item by item in an uncoordinated manner.

Weaving is the women's warpath while  (headhunting) is the men's warpath. The  blanket do have conventional or ritual motives depending on the purpose of the woven item. Those who finish the weaving lessons are called  (finish the wood) []. Among well-known ritual motifs are Gajah Meram (Brooding Elephant), Tiang Sandong (Ritual Pole), Meligai (Shrine) and Tiang Ranyai.

The Iban call this skill  — plaiting various items namely mats, baskets and hats. The Ibans weave mats of numerous types namely  (motive mat),  made of rattan and  made of rattan and  bark.

The height of the tubang basket fits the height of the human backside while the height of the lanji basket will extend between the bottom and head of the human. Thus, the lanji can carry twice as much as the tubang, making the latter more versatile than the former. The selabit backpack is used to carry uneven shaped bulk items e.g. the game obtained from the forest.

The Iban also make special baskets called  for the dead during Gawai Antu with numerous feet to denote the rank and status of the deceased which indicates his ultimate achievement during his lifetime.

Nowadays, they use shotguns and dogs for animal hunting. Dogs were reared by the Ibans in longhouses, especially in the past, for hunting purposes and warning the Iban of any approaching danger. Shotguns could and were purchased from the Brooke administration. The Ibans make their own blowpipes, and obtain honey from the  tree.

The Ibans can also make boats. Canoes for normal use are called , but big war boats are called  or bong. A canoe is usually fitted with long paddles and a sail made of  canvas. It is said that  is used to sail along the coasts of northern Borneo or even to travel across the sea, for example, to Singapore.

Seligi is a spear made of a natural strong and sharp material like aping palm. Some Iban are in blacksmithing although steel is bought through contact with the outside world.

Longhouse
The traditional Iban live in longhouses (rumah panjang or rumah panjai). The architecture of a longhouse along the longitude (length) is designed to imitate a standing tree with a trunk (symbolized by the central tiang pemun being erected first) in the middle point of the longhouse with a branch on the left and right hand size. The tree log or trunk used in the construction must be correctly jointed from their base to the tip. This sequence of base-tip is repeated along the left and right branches. At each joint, the trunk will be cut on the lower side at its base and on the upper side at its tip. So this sequence of lower-upper cut will be repeated at subsequent trunks until the end. On the side view of a longhouse, the architecture also imitates the standing tree design i.e. each central post of each family room has left and right branches. Therefore, each part of the longhouse must be maintained if the longhouse is to remain healthy like a natural tree living healthily.

The layout of a traditional longhouse of the Iban Dayak could be described as follows:

 A central wall runs along the length of the building approximately down the longitudinal axis of the building. The space along one side of the wall serves as a corridor running the length of the building while the other side is blocked from public view by the wall and serves as private areas.
 Behind this wall lie the private units, bilik, each with a single door for each family. These are separated from each other by walls of their own and contain the living and sleeping spaces for each family. The kitchens, may be situated within this private space but are nowadays often situated in rooms of their own, added to the back of a bilik or even in a building standing a little away from the longhouse and accessed by a small bridge. This separation prevents cooking fires from spreading to the living spaces, should they spread out of control, as well as reducing smoke and insects attracted to cooking from gathering in living quarters. The kitchen room also contains the dining room. Between the family apartment and kitchen, there can be an adjoining room where heirlooms like jars and brasswares are displayed. Behind the kitchen may be the bathroom and toilets. Further to this can be built another open-back end veranda called . A louvre is made in the roof to allow sunlight to permeate into the living and kitchen areas. A window opening is made between kitchens to allow exchange or sharing of food.
 The corridor itself is divided into three parts. This is where rice can be pounded or other domestic work can be done. A public corridor, a ruai, runs the length of the building in this open space. The ruai, is used by people in the longhouse to get together, and sometimes to make handicrafts like mats, baskets, and pua kumbu. Along the outer wall is the space where guests can sleep, the pantar. Above the upper ruai, a panggau (hung suite) is built for young bachelors of the respective families to live and sleep. On this side a large veranda, a tanju, is built in front of the building where the rice (padi) is dried and other outdoor activities can take place. The sadau, a sort of attic, runs along under the peak of the roof and serves as storage of paddy and other family possessions. Sometimes the sadau has a sort of gallery from which the life in the ruai can be observed. The pigs and chicken live underneath the house between the stilts.

A basic design of the inner side of each family house consists of an open room (bilek), a covered gallery (ruai), an open verandah (tanju) and a loft (sadau). The covered gallery has three areas called tempuan (highway), the lower ruai and the upper sitting area (pantal) after which is the open verandah. An upper palace (meligai) is built dedicated for children especially if they are raised as princess or prince (anak umbong) with servants to attend to them and thus protected from encounters with unsolicited suitors especially for the maidens in view of the "ngayap" (literally dating) culture. An opening between family rooms is normally provided to allow direct communication and easy sharing between families. The backside of a longhouse can also have a smaller open verandah called 'pelaboh' built. Due to its design, the longhouse is fit for residency, accommodation and a place of worship.

The front side of each longhouse shall be constructed towards the sunrise (east) and hence its backside is on the sunset. This provides enough sunlight for drying activities at the open verandah and to the inner side of the longhouse. The Iban normally design a window on the roof of each family room which is to be opened during daylight to allow sunlight coming in and thus provides sunlight into the inner side of the family room.

Another key factor in determining the right location for building a longhouse is the source of water, either from a river or a natural source of water (mata ai) if it is located on a hill or mount. The access to the sunrise is the overriding factor over the easy access to the river bank. The most ideal orientation of a longhouse is thus facing the sunrise and the river bank.

One more aspect considered when arranging the families in a row along the longhouse is that senior families will be arranged in descending order from the main central post. However, the families on the right hand side will be more senior than the families on the left-hand side. This is to follow the arrangement of the family arrangement in the Sengalang Burong's longhouse where Ketupong's room is situated on the right-hand side while Bejampong's room is on the left-hand side.

A longhouse will be abandoned once it is too far to reach the paddy farms of its inhabitants such as once the walk takes more than half a day to reach the farm. Each family must lighten and use their kitchen twice a month based on the rule not to leave the kitchen cold for an extended period of time, failing which they will be fined which is to be avoided at almost any cost. The inhabitants will then move to nearer to their farms. Normally, the Iban will continue to locate their farms upriver to open new virgin forests that are fertile and thus ensure a good yield. At the same time, the purpose is to have a lot of games from virgin forests, which is a source of protein to supplement the carbohydrate from the rice or wild sago. Nowadays, however, most longhouses are permanently constructed using modern materials like terraced houses in town areas. There are no more new areas to migrate to, anyway. So, the Iban dwell at one place almost permanently unless a new longhouse is being built to replace the old one.

Land ownership
Traditionally, Iban agriculture was based on actual integrated indigenous farming system. Iban Dayaks tend to plant paddy on hill slopes. Agricultural Land in this sense was used and defined primarily in terms of hill rice farming, ladang (garden), and hutan (forest). According to Prof Derek Freeman in his Report on Iban Agriculture, Iban Dayaks used to practice twenty-seven stages of hill rice farming once a year and their shifting cultivation practices allow the forest to regenerate itself rather than to damage the forest, thereby to ensure the continuity and sustainability of forest use and/or survival of the Iban community itself. The Iban Dayaks love virgin forests for their dependency on forests but that is for migration, territorial expansion, and/or fleeing enemies.

Once the Iban migrated into a riverine area, they will divide the area into three basic areas i.e. farming area, territorial domain (pemakai menoa) and forest reserve (pulau galau). The farming area is distributed accordingly to each family based on consensus. The chief and elders are responsible to settle any disputes and claims amicably. The territorial domain is a common area where the families of each longhouse are allowed to source for foods and confined themselves without encroachment into domains of other longhouses. The forest reserve is for common use, as a source of natural materials for building longhouse (ramu), boat making, plaiting, etc.

The whole riverine region can consist of many longhouses and thus the entire region belongs to all of them and they shall defend it against encroachment and attack by outsiders. Those longhouses sharing and living in the same riverine region call themselves shared owners (sepemakai).

Each track of virgin forest cleared by each family (rimba) will automatically belong to that family and inherited by its descendants as heirloom (pesaka) unless they migrate to other regions and relinquish their ownership of their land, which is symbolized by a token payment using a simple item in exchange for the land.

Piracy 

The Sea Dayaks, as their name implies, are a maritime set of tribes, and fight chiefly in canoes and boats. One of their favorite tactics is to conceal some of their larger boats, and then to send some small and badly manned canoes forward to attack the enemy to lure them. The canoes then retreat, followed by the enemy, and as soon as they pass the spot where the larger boats are hidden, they are attacked by them in the rear, while the smaller canoes, which have acted as decoys, turn and join in the fight. The rivers arc are chosen for this kind of attack, the overhanging branches of trees and the dense foliage of the bank affording excellent hiding places for the boats.

Many of the sea dayaks were also pirates. In the 19th century there was a great deal of piracy, and it was secretly encouraged by the native rulers, who obtained a share of the spoil, and also by the Malays who knew well how to handle a boat. The Malay fleet consisted of a large number of long war boats or prahu, each about 90 feet (27 m) long or more, and carrying a brass gun in the bow, the pirates being armed with swords, spears and muskets. Each boat was paddled by from 60 to 80 men. These boats skulked about in the sheltered coves waiting for their prey, and attacked merchant vessels making the passage between China and Singapore. The Malay pirates and their Dayak allies would wreck and destroy every trading vessel they came across, murder most of the crew who offered any resistance, and the rest were made as slaves. The Dayak would cut off the heads of those who were slain, smoke them over the fire to dry them, and then take them home to treasure as valued possessions.

Military
A Dayak war party in proas and canoes fought a battle with Murray Maxwell following the wreck of HMS Alceste in 1817 at the Gaspar Strait.

The Iban Dayak's first direct encounter with the Brooke and his men was in 1843, during the attack by Brooke's forces on the Batang Saribas region i.e. Padeh, Paku, and Rimbas respectively. The finale of this battle was the conference at Nagna Sebuloh to sign a peace Saribas treaty to end piracy and headhunting but the natives refused to sign it, rendering the treaty moot.

In 1844, Brooke's force attacked Batang Lupar, Batang Undop, and Batang Skrang to defeat the Malay sharifs and Dayak living in these regions. The Malay sharifs were easily defeated at Patusin in Batang Lupar, without a major fight despite their famous reputation and power over the native inlanders. However, during the battle of Batang Undop, one of Brooke's men, British Navy officer Mr. Charles Wade was killed in action at the battle of Ulu Undop while chasing the Malay sheriffs upriver. Subsequently, Brooke's Malay force headed by Datu Patinggi Ali and Mr. Steward was totally defeated by the Skrang Iban force at the battle of Kerangan Peris in the Batang Skrang region.

In 1849, at the Battle of Beting Maru, a convoy of Dayak boats that were returning from a sojourn at the River Rajan spotted Brooke's man of war, the Nemesis. They then landed on the Beting Maru sandbar and retreated to their villages, with two Dayak boats acting as a diversion by sailing towards the Nemesis and engaging her, with the two boats managing to retreat safely after a few shots were exchanged. The next day, the Dayak ambushed Brooke's pursuing force, killing two of Brooke's Iban entourage before pulling back.

Layang, the son-in-law of Libau "Rentap" was known as the first Iban slayer of a white man in the person of Mr. Alan Lee "Ti Mati Rugi" (Died In Vain) at the Battle of Lintang Batang in 1853, above the Skrang fort built by Brooke in 1850. The Brooke government had to launch three successive punitive expeditions against Libau Rentap to conquer his fortress known as Sadok Mount.
In total, the Brooke government conducted 52 punitive expeditions against the Iban including one against the Kayan.
 
The Iban attacked the Japanese force stationed at the Kapit fort at the end of the Second World War in 1945.  The Sarawak Rangers which were mostly Dayak participated in the anti-communist insurgency during the Malayan Emergency between 1948 to 1960. The Sarawak Rangers were despatched by the British to fight during the Brunei Rebellion in 1962. Later, the Sarawak Rangers fought against the Indonesian forces during the Confrontation against the formation of the Federation of Malaysia along the border with Kalimantan in 1963.

Two highly decorated Iban Dayak soldiers from Sarawak in Malaysia are Temenggung Datuk Kanang anak Langkau and Sgt Ngaliguh (both awarded Seri Pahlawan Gagah Perkasa) and Awang anak Raweng of Skrang (awarded a George Cross). So far, only one Dayak has reached the rank of a general in the Malaysian military: Brigadier-General Stephen Mundaw in the Malaysian Army, who was promoted on 1 November 2010.

Malaysia's most decorated war hero is Kanang anak Langkau due to his military services helping to liberate Malaya (and later Malaysia) from the communists. The youngest of the PGB holder is ASP Wilfred Gomez of the Police Force.

There were six holders of Sri Pahlawan (SP) Gagah Perkasa (the Gallantry Award) from Sarawak, and with the death of Kanang Anak Langkau, there is one SP holder in the person of Sgt. Ngalinuh.

Attire

The ceremonial  used for dances are as beautifully adorned with feathers, as are the costumes. There are various terms to describe different types of Dayak blades. The Nyabor is the traditional Iban Scimitar, Parang Ilang is common to Kayan and Kenyah Swordsmiths, pedang is a sword with a metallic handle and Duku is a multipurpose farm tool and machete of sorts.

Normally, the sword is accompanied by a wooden shield called a terabai which is decorated with a demon face to scare off the enemy.

Dayaks normally build their longhouses on high posts on high ground where possible for protection. They also may build kuta (fencing) and kubau (fort) where necessary to defend against enemy attacks. Dayaks also possess some brass and cast iron weaponry such as brass cannon (bedil) and iron cast cannon meriam. Furthermore, Dayaks are experienced in setting up animal traps (peti) which can be used for attacking the enemy as well. The agility and stamina of Dayaks in jungles give them advantages. However, at the end, Dayaks were defeated by handguns and disunity among themselves against the colonialists.

During headhunting days, those going to farms will be protected by warriors themselves, and big agriculture is also carried out via labour exchange called  (which means a large number of people working together) until completion of the agricultural activity. Kalingai or pantang (tattoo) is made unto bodies to protect from dangers and other signifying purposes such as travelling to certain places.

The traditional Iban Dayak male attire consists of a sirat (loincloth) attached with a small mat for sitting), lelanjang (headgear with colourful bird feathers) or a turban (a long piece of cloth wrapped around the head), marik (chain) around the neck, engkerimok (ring on thigh) and simpai (ring on the upper arms). The Iban Dayak female traditional attire comprises a short "kain tenun betating" (a woven cloth attached with coins and bells at the bottom end), a rattan or brass ring corset, selampai (long scarf) or marik empang (beaded top cover), sugu tinggi (high comb made of silver), simpai (bracelets on upper arms), tumpa (bracelets on lower arms) and buah pauh (fruits on hand).

The Dayaks especially the Ibans appreciate and treasure very much the value of pua kumbu (woven or tied cloth) made by women while ceramic jars which they call tajau obtained by men. Pua kumbu has various motives for which some are considered sacred. Tajau has various types with respective monetary values. The jar is a sign of good fortune and wealth. It can also be used to pay fines if some adat is broken in lieu of money which is hard to have in the old days. Beside the jar being used to contain rice or water, it is also used in ritual ceremonies or festivals and given as baya (provision) to the dead.

The adat tebalu (widow or widower fee) for deceased women for Iban Dayaks will be paid according to her social standing and weaving skills and for the men according to his achievements in his lifetime.

Dayaks being accustomed to living in jungles and hard terrains, and knowing the plants and animals are extremely good at following animals trails while hunting and of course tracking humans or enemies, thus some Dayaks became very good trackers in jungles in the military e.g. some Iban Dayaks were engaged as trackers during the anti-confrontation by Indonesia against the formation of Federation of Malaysia and anti-communism in Malaysia itself. No doubt, these survival skills are obtained while doing activities in the jungles, which are then utilised for headhunting in the old days.

Agriculture and economy
Traditionally, Iban agriculture was based on actual integrated indigenous farming system. Ibans plant hill rice paddies once a year in twenty-seven stages as described by Freeman in his report on Iban Agriculture. Agricultural Land in this sense was used and defined primarily in terms of hill rice farming, ladang (garden), and hutan (forest).  The main stages of the paddy cultivation is followed by the Iban lemambang bards to compose their ritual incantations. The bards also analogizes the headhunting expedition with the paddy cultivation stages. Other crops planted include , cucumber, corn, millet and cotton (tayak). Downriver Iban plant wet rice paddy at the low-lying riverine areas which are beyond the reach of the salt water tide.

Dayaks organised their labour in terms of traditionally based landholding groups which determined who owned rights to land and how it was to be used. The Iban Dayaks practice a rotational and reciprocal labour exchange called  to complete works on their farms own by all families within each longhouse. The "green revolution" in the 1950s, spurred on the planting of new varieties of wetland rice amongst Dayak tribes.

For cash, the Ibans find jungle produce to sell at the market or town. Later, they planted rubber, pepper and cocoa. Nowadays, many Ibans work in towns to seek better sources of income.

Trading is not a natural activity for the Iban. They did trade paddy for jars or salted fish coming from the sea in the old days but paddy lost its economic value a long time ago. Not much yield can be produced from repetitively replanted areas anyway because their planting relies on the natural source of fertilizer from the forest itself and the source of water for irrigation is from the rain, hence the cycle of the weather season is important and need to be correctly followed. Trading of sundries, jungle produce or agricultural produce is normally performed by the Chinese who commuted between the town and the location of the shop.

Military
The Iban are famous for being fearsome warriors in the past in defence of homeland or for migration to virgin territories. Two highly decorated Iban Dayak soldiers from Sarawak in Malaysia are Temenggung Datuk and Kanang anak Langkau (awarded the Seri Pahlawan Gagah Perkasa or Grand Knight of Valour) and Awang anak Raweng of Skrang (awarded a George Cross). So far, only one Dayak has reached the rank of general in the military, Brigadier-General Stephen Mundaw in the Malaysian Army, who was promoted on 1 November 2010.

Malaysia's most decorated war hero is Kanang Anak Langkau for his military service helping to liberate Malaya (and later Malaysia) from the communists, being the only soldier awarded both Seri Pahlawan (The Star of the Commander of Valour) and Panglima Gagah Berani (The Star of Valour). Among all the heroes are 21 holders of the Panglima Gagah Berani (PGB) including 2 recipients of the Seri Pahlawan. Of this total, there are 14 Ibans, two Chinese army officers, one Bidayuh, one Kayan and one Malay. But the majority of the Armed Forces are Malays, according to a book – Crimson Tide over Borneo. The youngest of the PGB holders is ASP Wilfred Gomez of the police force.

There were six holders of Sri Pahlawan (SP) and Panglima Gagah Perkasa from Sarawak, and with the death of Kanang Anak Langkau, there is one SP holder in the person of Sgt. Ngalinuh (an Orang Ulu).

In popular culture

 The episode "Into the Jungle" from Anthony Bourdain: No Reservations included the appearance of Itam, a former Sarawak Ranger and one of the Iban people's last members with the entegulun (Iban traditional hand tattoos) signifying his taking of an enemy's head.
 The film The Sleeping Dictionary features Selima (Jessica Alba), an Anglo-Iban girl who falls in love with John Truscott (Hugh Dancy). The movie was filmed primarily in Sarawak, Malaysia.
 Malaysian singer Noraniza Idris recorded "Ngajat Tampi" in 2000 and followed by "Tandang Bermadah" in 2002, which are based on traditional Iban music compositions. Both songs became popular in Malaysia and neighbouring countries.
 Chinta Gadis Rimba (or Love of a Forest Maiden), a 1958 film directed by L. Krishnan based on the novel of the same name by Harun Aminurrashid, tells about an Iban girl, Bintang, who goes against the wishes of her parents and runs off to her Malay lover. The film is the first time a full-length feature film was shot in Sarawak and the first time an Iban woman played the lead character.
 Bejalai is a 1987 film directed by Stephen Teo, notable for being the first film to be made in the Iban language and also the first Malaysian film to be selected for the Berlin International Film Festival. The film is an experimental feature about the custom among the Iban young men to do a "bejalai" (go on a journey) before attaining maturity.
 In Farewell to the King, a 1969 novel by Pierre Schoendoerffer plus its subsequent 1989 film adaptation, American prisoner-of-war Learoyd escapes a Japanese firing squad by hiding in the wilds of Borneo, where he is adopted by an Iban community.
 In 2007, Malaysian company Maybank produced a wholly Iban-language commercial commemorating Malaysia's 50th anniversary of independence. The advert, directed by Yasmin Ahmad with help of the Leo Burnett agency, was shot in Bau and Kapit and used an all-Sarawakian cast.
A conflict between a proa of "sea-dyaks" and the shipwrecked Jack Aubrey and his crew forms much of the first part of The Nutmeg of Consolation (1991), Patrick O'Brian's fourteenth Aubrey-Maturin novel.

Notable people
 Bandi Anak Ragai, or well known as Apai Janggut, chief of Sungai Utik Iban longhouse and 2019 UN Equator Prize awardee.
 Rentap, Leader of a rebellion against the Brooke administration and used the title of Raja Ulu (king of the Interior).
 Datu Bandar Bawen, Bruneian political figure, a close friend to Sultan Ahmad Tajuddin.
 Temenggung Koh Anak Jubang, the first paramount chief of Dayak in Sarawak.
 Jugah anak Barieng, second Paramount Chief of the Dayak people and the key signatory on behalf of Sarawak to the Malaysia Agreement.
 Datu Tigai anak Bawen, (1946–2005), business tycoon and millionaire. Cousin of Jugah anak Barieng.
 Stephen Kalong Ningkan, the first Chief Minister of Sarawak.
 Tawi Sli, the second Chief Minister of Sarawak.
 Kanang anak Langkau, National hero of Malaysia. Awarded the medal of valour "Sri Pahlawan Gagah Berani" by the Malaysian Government.
 Awang Anak Raweng awarded the George Cross medal by the British Government.
 Henry Golding, actor; has an English father and Iban mother.
 Daniel Tajem Miri, former Deputy Chief Minister of Sarawak.
 Misha Minut Panggau, First International Award Winning Iban Lady Feature Film Director, Producer & Script Writer (Belaban Hidup-Infeksi Zombie).
 Cassidy Panggau, Iban Feature Film Actor.
 Ray Lee, Award Winning Film Director, Producer, Music Entrepreneur & Creative Activist.
 Bonnie Bunyau Gustin, World Para Powerlifting Paralympic Gold Medalist
 Haimie Anak Nyaring , Brunei Footballer player.
 Suhaimi Anak Sulau , Brunei Football player.
 Francisca Luhong James , Miss Universe Malaysia 2020; has an Orang Ulu father and Iban mother.
 Micheal Anak Garing, a Sarawakian murderer who was executed in Singapore
 Tony Anak Imba, a Sarawakian murderer sentenced to life imprisonment and caning by Singapore.
Kho Jabing, a Sarawakian of mixed Chinese and Iban descent who was executed in Singapore for murder

See also
 History of the Iban people
 Bornean traditional tattooing
 Iban language
 Iban culture
 View of the tiger

Citations

General bibliography 
 Sir Steven Runciman, The White Rajahs: a history of Sarawak from 1841 to 1946 (1960).
 James Ritchie, The Life Story of Temenggong Koh (1999)
 Benedict Sandin, Gawai Burong: The chants and celebrations of the Iban Bird Festival (1977)
 Greg Verso, Blackboard in Borneo, (1989)
 Renang Anak Ansali, New Generation of Iban, (2000)

External links
 

 
Dayak people
Ethnic groups in Brunei
Ethnic groups in Indonesia
Ethnic groups in Sarawak
Headhunting
Indigenous peoples of Southeast Asia